École nationale supérieure des sciences agronomiques de Bordeaux Aquitaine (Bordeaux Sciences Agro) a French engineering College.

Founded in 1963, the school was the first École nationale d'ingénieurs des travaux agricoles (ENITA) created in France following the Pisani law of August 2, 1960. Specialized in viticulture and forestry, it acquired in 1999 the wine estate Luchey Halde from its own funds. Its current name is from 2011.

Located in Bordeaux, the school is a public higher education institution part of University of Bordeaux. The school is a member of the Conférence des Grandes Écoles.

References

External links
 Bordeaux Sciences Agro

Engineering universities and colleges in France
Bordeaux
Bordeaux Sciences Agro
Educational institutions established in 1963
1963 establishments in France